Ben Cunnington may refer to:

Ben Cunnington (archaeologist) (1861–1950), British archaeologist
Ben Cunnington (footballer) (born 1991), Australian rules footballer

See also
Cunnington (surname)